The 1998 German Masters was a professional non-ranking snooker tournament that took place between 8–13 December 1998 at the Best Western Rheinhotel in Bingen am Rhein, Germany.

Twelve players competed, 10 of the leading 11 in the world rankings, together with Steve Davis and Jimmy White. Ronnie O'Sullivan, ranked 3 in the world, did not compete. Matches were over 9 frames, except for the final which the best-of-11. Prize money was £110,000 with all players guaranteed a minimum of £5,000 for competing.

Tony Drago beat Stephen Hendry in the quarter-finals, his first win over Hendry in 13 attempts. John Parrott beat world number one, John Higgins, at the same stage. Parrott beat Mark Williams 6–4 in the final. Williams led 4–3 but Parrott won the next three to win the match. It was Parrott's first win since the European Open in March 1996. Parrott also won the £1,000 high break prize for a break of 130 in his semi-final match.

Prize fund
The breakdown of prize money for this year is shown below:
Winner: £25,000
Runner-up: £16,000
Semi-final: £10,000
Quarter-final: £7,000
Last 12: £5,000
Highest break: £1,000
Total: £110,000

Main draw

Final

Century breaks

130, 114  John Parrott
123  Anthony Hamilton

References

1998
German Masters
Masters
Snooker non-ranking competitions
Sports competitions in Rhineland-Palatinate